UCI Juniors Road World Championships – Men's time trial is the annual world championship for road bicycle racing in the discipline of time trial, organised by the world governing body, the Union Cycliste Internationale. The event was first run in 1994. In 2020 no junior race was held due to the COVID-19 pandemic.

Medal winners

Medallists by nation

References

Men's time trial
Junior men's time trial
 
Lists of UCI Road World Championships medalists